S.C. Hora S.A. (trade name: Hora Instruments) is a Romanian manufacturer of string instruments. The company, based in Reghin, was founded in 1951 around the workshop of master luthier Roman Boianciuc as a state-owned enterprise.

Over 80% of its products are exported to North America, Western and Northern Europe, Russia and Japan. HORA uses as raw materials spruce and maple wood from the Romanian Carpathians seasoned naturally for 5–10 years, as well as imported exotic wood like mahogany, Indian rosewood and ebony.

The company employs about 300 people (2017) and is the largest stringed instrument manufacturer in Europe.

Divisions 
Hora owns and operates the "Rapsodia" musical instruments shop in Bucharest, founded in 1999.

Quality policies and standards 
SR ISO 9001:2001
SR ISO 14001:2005
OHSAS 18001:1999

See also 
 Violin making and maintenance
 Violin construction and mechanics
 Classical guitar making
 Lutherie

References

External links
 
 
 

Romanian luthiers
Bow makers
Classical guitar makers
Design companies established in 1951
Guitar manufacturing companies
Musical instrument manufacturing companies of Romania
Reghin
Companies of Mureș County
Romanian brands
Manufacturing companies established in 1951
1951 establishments in Romania